Thibault Tchicaya (born 17 July 1983) is a Gabon international footballer who plays as a defender who plays for Missile FC.

Career
Born in Makokou, Tchicaya has played in his native Gabon for Tout Puissant Akwembe, Delta Téléstar, Sogéa FC and Missile FC. At age 30, he signed with Mbabane Swallows F.C. of Swaziland on a six-month contract in January 2009.

Tchicaya has made several appearances for the Gabon national football team. He played for the side the finished third at the 2005 CEMAC Cup.

References

External links

1983 births
Living people
Gabonese footballers
Delta Téléstar players
Expatriate footballers in Eswatini
Gabon international footballers
Association football defenders
Gabonese expatriate footballers
Mbabane Swallows players
People from Ogooué-Ivindo Province
21st-century Gabonese people